Lady Margaret Elizabeth Montagu Douglas Scott (10 October 1846 – 5 February 1918), originally known as Lady Margaret Scott, was a Scottish aristocrat and traveller. She married Donald Cameron, 24th Lochiel.

Early life 

Lady Margaret Scott was born at Dalkeith Palace in 1846, the second daughter of Walter Montagu Douglas Scott, 5th Duke of Buccleuch, an eminent peer and politician, and his wife, Lady Charlotte Anne Thynne, daughter of the 2nd Marquess of Bath and Hon. Isabella Byng, daughter of George Byng, 4th Viscount Torrington. 

The details of her life before marriage are relatively unknown. She is known however, to have been a bridesmaid at the wedding of Princess Helena and Prince Christian of Schleswig-Holstein in July, 1866.

Marriage and children 
On 9 December 1875 she married Donald Cameron of Lochiel, a diplomat, politician, courtier and the 24th Chief of Clan Cameron. Upon her marriage to Lochiel she became Lady Cameron of Lochiel and resided at his seat of Achnacarry Castle in the Scottish Highlands. The couple had four sons:

 Colonel Sir Donald Walter Cameron of Lochiel (4 November 1876 – 11 October 1951), who succeeded as the 25th chief 
 Ewen Charles Cameron (18 February 1878 – 21 March 1958)
 Alan George Cameron (27 July 1880 – 26 September 1914)
 Archibald Cameron (5 January 1886 – 3 May 1917)

Two of her sons were killed during the First World War.

Death 
Lady Margaret, a widow from 1905  died on 5 February 1918 of Spanish flu.

In popular culture 
Lady Margaret is the subject of Sarah, Duchess of York's historical-fiction romance novel Her Heart for a Compass. Sarah is the great-great-niece of Lady Margaret through her nephew Lord Herbert Scott.

References 

1846 births
1918 deaths
Scottish noblewomen
People from Dalkeith
Daughters of British dukes
Clan Scott
Clan Cameron
Female characters in literature